The Couch Trip is a 1988 American comedy film directed by Michael Ritchie. It stars Dan Aykroyd, Walter Matthau, Charles Grodin and Donna Dixon. It is loosely based on the 1971 novel The Couch Trip, by Ken Kolb.

Plot

Alleged mental patient John Burns (Dan Aykroyd) is sent to Dr Lawrence Baird's office (David Clennon) after causing a riot in the hospital cafeteria. Dr Baird receives a message from his secretary that a patient was in need of him. As Dr Baird leaves his office, coincidentally Burns intercepts a telephone call from lawyer Harvey Michaels (Richard Romanus), requesting if Dr. Baird could fill in for Dr. George Maitlin (Charles Grodin) on his popular radio talk show.  Burns assumes Dr. Baird's identity and jumps at the chance to escape the hospital. With the help of Dr. Baird's secretary, he breaks out and picks up a waiting ticket at the Chicago airport.

Burns arrives in Los Angeles, where he is met by Dr. Maitlin's radio show assistant Dr. Laura Rollins (Donna Dixon) and escorted to the waiting limousine. He crosses paths with Donald Becker (Walter Matthau), a crazy faux priest who is collecting money to save plants. Becker recognizes the trousers Burns is wearing to be prison issue.

When the time comes to do the radio talk show, Burns is a huge hit, offering people free consultations and using profanity on the air. He even arranges for listeners to go to a baseball game at Dodger Stadium for free (where he also sings the National Anthem).

All goes well until Dr. Maitlin meets the real Dr. Baird in London, when they both attend the same seminar. They fly back to L.A. to try to find what is going on behind their backs.

Burns has been paid for the show (in cash) and is ready to leave town when he sees on the in-flight TV that Becker is on top of the Hollywood sign shouting Baird's name. Burns decides to go back and help to resolve the situation, where he is arrested only to be rescued on the way to the penitentiary by Becker and Dr. Rollins.

In the last few scenes of the movie, Burns gives his inmate number "7474505B" which is the same number that Jake Blues had in The Blues Brothers and Louis Winthorpe III in Trading Places.

Cast
 Dan Aykroyd as John W. Burns, Jr.
 Walter Matthau as Donald Becker
 Charles Grodin as George Maitlin
 Donna Dixon as Laura Rollins
 Richard Romanus as Harvey Michaels
 Mary Gross as Vera Maitlin
 David Clennon as Lawrence Baird
 Scott Thomson as Klevin
 David Wohl as Dr. Smet
 Arye Gross as  Perry Kovin
 Victoria Jackson as Robin
 Chevy Chase as "Condom Father" (cameo appearance)

Reception

The movie received mixed reviews. It has a rating of 33% based on 9 reviews on Rotten Tomatoes.

Home media

Although the film was a flop at the box office, it did well on home video.

References

External links
 
 
 

1988 films
1988 comedy films
American comedy films
Films set in Los Angeles
Orion Pictures films
Films with screenplays by Walter Bernstein
Films scored by Michel Colombier
Films directed by Michael Ritchie
Films with screenplays by Steven Kampmann
1980s English-language films
1980s American films